Bilukeh (also Romanized as Bīlūkeh) is a village in Gavork-e Nalin Rural District, Vazineh District, Sardasht County, West Azerbaijan Province, Iran. At the 2006 census, its population was 225, in 34 families.

References 

Populated places in Sardasht County